Hit list or The Hit List may refer to:

 A list of would-be victims in contract killing
 Record chart, a ranking of recorded music according to popularity during a given period of time

Film and TV
 Hit List (1989 film), starring Jan-Michael Vincent — hitmen kill and kidnap the wrong people
 The Hit List (2011 film), featuring Cuba Gooding, Jr.
 Hit List (TV series), a Canadian television series which aired music videos
 The Hit List (game show), a British game show hosted by Marvin and Rochelle Humes
 The Hit List TV, an Australian music show

Music
 Hit List (musical), a 2013 musical based on a fictional musical in the television series Smash
 The Hit List (Joan Jett album)
 The Hit List (Saafir album)
 The Hit List (Unwritten Law album)
 The Hit List (Cliff Richard album), a 1994 compilation album by Cliff Richard

Other uses
 Hit List, a 2000 novel by Lawrence Block